The Wet rock physa, scientific name Physella zionis, is a species of freshwater snail, an aquatic pulmonate gastropod mollusc in the family Physidae, the bladder snails.

References

Oliver, G. V. and Bosworth, W. R. III.  (1999).  Rare, Imperiled, and Recently Extinct or Extirpated Mollusks of Utah: A Literature Review.  Utah Division of Wildlife Resources.  Publication Number 99-29.

Physidae
Molluscs of the United States
Endemic fauna of Utah
Taxa named by Henry Augustus Pilsbry
Gastropods described in 1926
Taxonomy articles created by Polbot